Blanchard Run is a  long 1st order tributary to Anderson Creek in Clearfield County, Pennsylvania.

Course 
Blanchard Run rises about 2.5 miles east-northeast of Home Camp, Pennsylvania, and then flows generally northwest to join Anderson Creek about 1 mile northeast of Home Camp.

Watershed 
Blanchard Run drains  of area, receives about 44.9 in/year of precipitation, has a wetness index of 434.11, and is about 97% forested.

See also 
 List of Pennsylvania Rivers

References

Watershed Maps 

Rivers of Pennsylvania
Rivers of Clearfield County, Pennsylvania